Flaminio–Piazza del Popolo is an underground station on Line A of the Rome Metro, inaugurated in 1980. The station is situated on the large Piazzale Flaminio, in the Flaminio quarter outside the Aurelian Walls, next to Piazza del Popolo, and is near the Campus Martius.

A tram (line 2) connects the Piazzale Flaminio to the Stadio Flaminio, the Auditorium at the Parco della Musica, the Palazzetto of the Sport and the Stadio Olimpico.

The entrance hall of the station accommodates some mosaics of the Rome Artemetro Prize, created by Paul D' Orazio and Lee Doo Shik.

Flaminio is also the Rome terminus of the Rome–Civitacastellana–Viterbo railway, on which suburban services run through the Rome outskirts to Viterbo.

Services
This station has:
 Escalators (underground)
 Ticket office (mainline)

Connecting Services
Line A
Roma-Viterbo

Located Nearby
Villa Borghese
Piazza del Popolo
Porta del Popolo
Santa Maria del Popolo
Pincio
Via del Corso
Via del Babuino
Via Margutta
Via di Ripetta

External links

Flaminio underground station on the Rome public transport site (in Italian)
Flaminio mainline station on the Rome public transport site (in Italian)

Rome Metro Line A stations
Railway stations opened in 1980
1980 establishments in Italy
Rome Q. I Flaminio
Rome Q. III Pinciano
Railway stations in Italy opened in the 20th century